The Oakland Athletics' 2011 season was the 44th for the franchise in the Bay Area, as well as the 111th in club history. The team was competing for the American League West Division title after a 4-year absence from playoff contention, with a payroll just above $77 million.

Off-season/spring training

Coaching changes

Young declined a 2-year contract offer and became Boston's pitching coach. Steverson becomes hitting coach for Sacramento.

Transactions
April 27, C Kurt Suzuki moved to paternity list and recalled C Josh Donaldson.
April 25, Activated P Michael Wuertz and optioned P Bobby Cramer.
April 18, Traded P Daniel Farquhar to Toronto for P David Purcey. Transferred P Rich Harden to 60-Day DL.
April 6, Recalled P Tyson Ross from Sacramento.
March 30, Placed IF Adam Rosales on 60-Day DL. Purchased contract and recalled IF Andy LaRoche.
January 24, Traded P Clayton Mortensen to Colorado for minor league P Ethan Hollingsworth. Signed free agent IF Andy LaRoche to a minor league deal with an invite to big league camp.
January 19, Signed free agent P Brian Fuentes to a two-year, $10.5M deal and third-year club option. DFA'd IF Steven Tolleson.
January 18, Signed free agent P Grant Balfour to a two-year, $8.1M deal and third-year club option. DFA'd P Clayton Mortensen. Avoid arbitration with P Dallas Braden (1yr/$3.35M), OF Conor Jackson (1yr/$3.2M), 3B Kevin Kouzmanoff (1yr/$4.75M), OF Josh Willingham (1yr/$6M).
January 8, Acquired P Guillermo Moscoso from Texas for minor league P Ryan Kelly (acquired from Pittsburgh for minor league UT Corey Wimberly in December). DFA'd P Philip Humber, claimed by Chicago.
December 21, Signed free agent P Rich Harden to a one-year, $1.5M deal.
December 17, Claimed P Philip Humber off waivers from Kansas City.
December 16, Traded P Henry Rodríguez and OF Corey Brown to Washington for OF Josh Willingham.
December 14, Signed free agent DH Hideki Matsui to a one-year, $4.25M deal.
December 13, Signed free agent P Brandon McCarthy to a one-year, $1M deal. Avoided arbitration with P Joey Devine (1yr/$850k)
December 3, Avoided arbitration with OF Ryan Sweeney (1yr/$1.4M)
December 2, Non-tendered OF Travis Buck (Cleveland), DH Jack Cust (Seattle) and IF Edwin Encarnación (Toronto).
November 19, Added OF Corey Brown, IF Adrian Cardenas, IF Sean Doolittle, P Trystan Magnuson, and OF Michael Taylor to 40-man roster.
November 17, Traded OF Rajai Davis to Toronto for minor league P Trystan Magnuson and P Daniel Farquhar.
November 12, Claimed IF Edwin Encarnación off waivers from Toronto.
November 10, Traded P Vin Mazzaro and minor league P Justin Marks to Kansas City for OF David DeJesus.
November 8, Won bid for NPB pitcher Hisashi Iwakuma, but were not able to finalize a deal.
November 3, Picked up club options on OF Coco Crisp ($5.75M) and IF Mark Ellis ($6M). Declined $12.5M option on IF Eric Chavez (New York), making him a free agent for 1st time in his career.
November 2, Outrighted P Boof Bonser and OF Matt Carson to AAA. Resigned Carson to a minor-league contract. Bonser (New York) elected to become a free agent. P Justin James claimed off waivers by Milwaukee. P Justin Duchscherer and P Ben Sheets become free agents.
October 30, Outrighted OF Gabe Gross, UT Jeff Larish, P Jon Meloan, and P Justin Souza to AAA. Gross (Seattle) and Larish (Philadelphia)  elected to become free agents.
October 7, Outrighted OF Jeremy Hermida, P Brad Kilby and P Ross Wolf to AAA. Hermida (Cincinnati) and Wolf (Houston) elected to become free agents.
October 5, Released Cedrick Bowers.
October 4, Released IF Akinori Iwamura (Tohoku Rakuten).

Changes in apparel
The A's were known for sporting white jerseys at home and greys for away games. On top of that, the A's wore a black and a green alternate jersey. During the 2011 season, they added a new style. The A's started wearing a gold alternate home jersey to their apparel. Manager Billy Beane referred to the look as "the Canary yellow" jerseys. A's relief pitcher Jerry Blevins said, "It might be hard not to notice us now".

Regular season

Roster

Game log

|-  style="text-align:center; background:#fbb;"
| 1 || April 1 || Mariners || 2–6 || Hernández (1–0) || Breslow (0–1) ||  || 36,067 || 0–1
|-  style="text-align:center; background:#fbb;"
| 2 || April 2 || Mariners || 2–5 || Ray (1–0) || Fuentes (0–1) || League (1) || 15,088 || 0–2
|-  style="text-align:center; background:#bfb;"
| 3 || April 3 || Mariners || 7–1 || Gonzalez (1–0) || Fister (0–1) ||  || 22,292 || 1–2
|-  style="text-align:center; background:#fbb;"
| 4 || April 5 || @ Blue Jays || 6–7 (10) || Frasor (1–0) || Balfour (0–1)  ||  || 11,077 ||  1–3
|-  style="text-align:center; background:#fbb;"
| 5 || April 6 || @ Blue Jays || 3–5 || Litsch (1–0) || Braden (0–1) || Rauch (1) || 11,684 ||  1–4
|-  style="text-align:center; background:#bfb;"
| 6 || April 7 || @ Blue Jays || 2–1 || Cahill (1–0)  || Frasor (1–1) || Fuentes (1)  || 19,528 || 2–4
|-  style="text-align:center; background:#fbb;"
| 7 || April 8 || @ Twins || 1–2 || Pavano (1–1) || Anderson (0–1) || Nathan (3) || 40,714 || 2–5
|-  style="text-align:center; background:#bfb;"
| 8 || April 9 || @ Twins || 1–0 || Gonzalez (2–0) || Blackburn (1–1) || Fuentes (2) || 39,936 || 3–5
|-  style="text-align:center; background:#bfb;"
| 9 || April 10 || @ Twins || 5–3 || McCarthy (1–0) || Baker (0–2) || Fuentes (3) || 38,484 || 4–5
|-  style="text-align:center; background:#bfb;"
| 10 || April 11 || @ White Sox || 2–1 (10) || Ross (1–0) || Crain (0–1) || Fuentes (4) || 20,057 || 5–5
|-  style="text-align:center; background:#fbb;"
| 11 || April 12 || @ White Sox || 5–6 (10) || Sale (2–0) || Cramer (0–1) || || 18,020 || 5–6
|-  style="text-align:center; background:#bfb;"
| 12 || April 13 || @ White Sox || 7–4 (10) || Balfour (1–1) || Thornton (0–2) || Fuentes (5) || 16,523 || 6–6
|-  style="text-align:center; background:#fbb;"
| 13 || April 14 || Tigers || 0–3 || Coke (1–2) || Ross (1–1) || Valverde (3) || 11,129 || 6–7
|-  style="text-align:center; background:#fbb;"
| 14 || April 15 || Tigers || 4–8 (10) || Villarreal (1–0) || Fuentes 0–2 || || 21,853 || 6–8
|-  style="text-align:center; background:#bfb;"
| 15 || April 16 || Tigers || 6–2 || Braden (1–1) || Verlander (1–2) || || 16,265 || 7–8
|-  style="text-align:center; background:#bfb;"
| 16 || April 17 || Tigers || 5–1 || Cahill (2–0) || Penny (0–2) || || 16,460 || 8–8
|-  style="text-align:center; background:#bfb;"
| 17 || April 19 || Red Sox || 5–0 || Anderson (1–1) || Lackey (1–2) ||  || 25,230 || 9–8
|-  style="text-align:center; background:#fbb;"
| 18 || April 20 || Red Sox || 3–5 || Buchholz (1–2) || Gonzalez (2–1) || Papelbon (3) || 29,045 || 9–9
|-  style="text-align:center; background:#fbb;"
| 19 || April 21 || @ Mariners || 0–1 || Hernández (2–2) || McCarthy (1–1) || League (4) || 12,770 || 9–10
|-  style="text-align:center; background:#fbb;"
| 20 || April 22 || @ Mariners || 0–4 || Pineda (3–1) || Ross (1–2) || League (5) || 17,798 || 9–11
|-  style="text-align:center; background:#bfb;"
| 21 || April 23 || @ Mariners || 9–1 || Cahill (3–0)  || Vargas (0–2) ||  || 25,355 || 10–11
|-  style="text-align:center; background:#bfb;"
| 22 || April 24 || @ Mariners || 5–2 || Anderson (2–1) || Laffey (0–1) || Fuentes (6) || 16,530 || 11–11 
|-  style="text-align:center; background:#fbb;"
| 23 || April 25 || @ Angels || 0–5 || Weaver (6–0) || Gonzalez (2–2) ||  || 37,115 || 11–12
|-  style="text-align:center; background:#fbb;"
| 24 || April 26 || @ Angels || 3–8 || Chatwood (2–1) || McCarthy (1–2) ||  || 37,228 || 11–13
|-  style="text-align:center; background:#bfb;"
| 25 || April 27 || @ Angels || 2–1 (10) || Fuentes (1–2) || Walden (0–1) || Ziegler (1) || 37,247 || 12–13
|-  style="text-align:center; background:#bfb;"
| 26 || April 29 || Rangers || 3–1 || Cahill (4–0) || Wilson (3–1) || Fuentes (7) || 17,226 || 13–13
|-  style="text-align:center; background:#fbb;"
| 27 || April 30 || Rangers || 2–11 || Lewis (2–3) || Anderson (2–2) || || 27,285 || 13–14
|-

|-  style="text-align:center; background:#bfb;"
| 28 || May 1 ||  Rangers || 7–2 || Gonzalez (3–2) || Harrison (3–3) || || 15,178 || 14–14
|-  style="text-align:center; background:#bfb;"
| 29 || May 2 ||  Rangers || 5–4 (10) || Balfour (2–1) || Oliver (1–3) || || 9,193 || 15–14
|-  style="text-align:center; background:#fbb;"
| 30 || May 3 || Indians || 1–4 || Carmona (3–3) || Fuentes (1–3) || C. Perez (8) || 10,135 || 15–15
|-  style="text-align:center; background:#bfb;"
| 31 || May 4 || Indians || 3–1 || Cahill (5–0) || Tomlin (4–1) || Balfour (1) || 13,872 || 16–15
|-  style="text-align:center; background:#fbb;"
| 32 || May 5 || Indians || 3–4 (12) || Durbin (2–1) || Breslow (0–2) || C. Perez (9) || 14,353 || 16–16
|-  style="text-align:center; background:#bfb;"
| 33 || May 6|| @ Royals || 3–2 || Gonzalez (4–2) || O'Sullivan (1–2) || Fuentes (8) || 30,690 || 17–16
|-  style="text-align:center; background:#fbb;"
| 34 || May 7|| @ Royals || 3–4 || Soria (2–0) || McCarthy (1–3) ||  || 25,828 || 17–17 
|-  style="text-align:center; background:#bfb;"
| 35 || May 8|| @ Royals || 5–2 || Ross (2–2) || Francis (0–4) || Fuentes (9) || 22,435 || 18–17
|-  style="text-align:center; background:#bfb;"
| 36 || May 9 || @ Rangers || 7–2 || Cahill (6–0) || Wilson (4–2) || || 24,375 || 19–17
|-  style="text-align:center; background:#fbb;"
| 37 || May 10 || @ Rangers || 2–7 || Lewis (3–4) || Anderson (2–3) || || 31,655 || 19–18
|-  style="text-align:center; background:#bbb;"
|  || May 11 || @ Rangers || colspan=6| Postponed (rain); Makeup: July 7
|-  style="text-align:center; background:#fbb;"
| 38 || May 13 || White Sox || 3–4 || Humber (3–3) || McCarthy (1–4) || Santos (4) || 12,690 || 19–19
|-  style="text-align:center; background:#bfb;"
| 39 || May 14 || White Sox || 6–2 || Ross (3–2) || Floyd (4–3) || || 17,291 || 20–19
|-  style="text-align:center; background:#fbb;"
| 40 || May 15 || White Sox || 3–4 || Buehrle (3–3) || Cahill (6–1) || Santos (5) || 19,018 || 20–20
|-  style="text-align:center; background:#bfb;"
| 41 || May 16 || Angels || 5–4 (10) || Balfour (3–1) || Rodney (2–2) ||  || 11,061 || 21–20
|-  style="text-align:center; background:#bfb;"
| 42 || May 17 || Angels || 14–0 || Gonzalez (5–2) || Chatwood (2–2) ||  || 12,190 || 22–20
|-  style="text-align:center; background:#fbb;"
| 43 || May 18 || Twins || 3–4 (10) || Nathan (1–1) || Fuentes (1–4)  || Capps (7) || 15,355 || 22–21
|-  style="text-align:center; background:#fbb;"
| 44 || May 19 || Twins || 1–11 || Blackburn (3–4) || Ross (3–3) || || 22,320 || 22–22
|-  style="text-align:center; background:#fbb;"
| 45 || May 20 || @ Giants || 1–2 (10) || López (2–0) || Fuentes (1–5) ||  || 42,224 || 22–23
|-  style="text-align:center; background:#fbb;"
| 46 || May 21 || @ Giants || 0–3 || Lincecum (4–4) || Anderson (2–4) ||  || 42,152 || 22–24
|-  style="text-align:center; background:#fbb;"
| 47 || May 22 || @ Giants || 4–5 (11) || Romo (2–0) || Fuentes (1–6) ||  || 42,288 || 22–25
|-  style="text-align:center; background:#fbb;"
| 48 || May 23 || @ Angels || 1–4 || Downs (2–1) || Fuentes (1–7) || Walden (9) || 36,215 || 22–26
|-  style="text-align:center; background:#bfb;"
| 49 || May 24 || @ Angels || 6–1 || Moscoso (1–0) || Haren (4–3) ||  || 39,117 || 23–26
|-  style="text-align:center; background:#fbb;"
| 50 || May 25 || @ Angels || 1–4 || Santana (3–4) || Cahill (6–2) || Walden (10) || 40,253 || 23–27
|-  style="text-align:center; background:#bfb;"
| 51 || May 26 || @ Angels || 4–3 || Anderson (3–4) || Piñeiro (2–1) ||  || 33,412 || 24–27
|-  style="text-align:center; background:#bfb;"
| 52 || May 27 || Orioles || 6–2 || Ziegler (1–0) || Simón (1–1) ||  || 12,110 || 25–27
|-  style="text-align:center; background:#bfb;"
| 53 || May 28 || Orioles || 4–2 || Outman (1–0) || Bergesen (1–6) || Fuentes (10) || 23,795 || 26–27
|-  style="text-align:center; background:#bfb;"
| 54 || May 29 || Orioles || 6–4 || Moscoso (2–0) || Britton (5–3) || Fuentes (11) || 15,373 || 27–27
|-  style="text-align:center; background:#fbb;"
| 55 || May 30 || Yankees || 0–5 || Colón (3–3) || Cahill (6–3) || || 35,067 ||27–28
|-  style="text-align:center; background:#fbb;"
| 56 || May 31 || Yankees || 3–10 || García (3–4) || Anderson (3–5) || || 22,581 || 27–29
|-

|-  style="text-align:center; background:#fbb;"
| 57 || June 1 || Yankees || 2–4 || Burnett (6–3)|| Gonzalez (5–3) || Rivera (14) || 25,469 || 27–30
|-  style="text-align:center; background:#fbb;"
| 58 || June 3 || @ Red Sox || 6–8 || Jenks (2–2) || Devine (0–1) ||  || 37,808 || 27–31
|-  style="text-align:center; background:#fbb;"
| 59 || June 4 || @ Red Sox || 8–9 (14) || Aceves (3–1) || Moscoso (2–1) ||  || 37,485 || 27–32
|-  style="text-align:center; background:#fbb;"
| 60 || June 5 || @ Red Sox || 3–6 || Lackey (3–5) || Anderson (3–6) || Bard (1) || 37,796 || 27–33
|-  style="text-align:center; background:#fbb;"
| 61 || June 6 || @ Orioles || 2–4 || Matusz (1–0) || Gonzalez (5–4) || Gregg (11) || 10,556 || 27–34
|-  style="text-align:center; background:#fbb;"
| 62 || June 7 || @ Orioles || 0–4 || Jakubauskas (1–0) || Moscoso (2–2) ||  || 13,652 || 27–35
|-  style="text-align:center; background:#fbb;"
| 63 || June 8 || @ Orioles || 2–3 || Britton (6–4) || Outman (1–1) || Gregg (12) || 11,760 || 27–36 
|-  style="text-align:center; background:#fbb;"
| 64 || June 9 || @ White Sox || 4–9 || Buehrle (6–4) || Cahill (6–4) || || 22,170 || 27–37
|-  style="text-align:center; background:#bfb;"
| 65 || June 10 || @ White Sox || 7–5 || Balfour (4–1) || Santos (2–3) || Bailey (1) || 20,166 || 28–37
|-  style="text-align:center; background:#fbb;"
| 66 || June 11 || @ White Sox || 2–3 || Danks (2–8) || Gonzalez (5–5) || Crain (1) || 24,391 || 28–38
|-  style="text-align:center; background:#fbb;"
| 67 || June 12 || @ White Sox || 4–5 || Humber (6–3) || Moscoso (2–3) || Santos (12) || 22,144 || 28–39
|-  style="text-align:center; background:#fbb;"
| 68 || June 14|| Royals || 4–7 || Duffy (1–2) || Cahill (6–5) || Soria (10) || 11,439 || 28–40
|-  style="text-align:center; background:#bfb;"
| 69 || June 15|| Royals || 2–1 || Outman (2–1) || Hochevar (4–7) || Bailey (2) || 16,392 || 29–40
|-  style="text-align:center; background:#bfb;"
| 70 || June 16|| Royals || 8–4 || Gonzalez (6–5) || Francis (3–7) ||  || 11,775 || 30–40
|-  style="text-align:center; background:#bfb;"
| 71 || June 17 || Giants || 5–2 || Godfrey (1–0) || Lincecum (5–6) || Bailey (3) || 36,067 || 31–40
|-  style="text-align:center; background:#bfb;"
| 72 || June 18 || Giants || 4–2 || Ziegler (2–0) || Sánchez (4–5) || Bailey (4) || 36,067 || 32–40
|-  style="text-align:center; background:#bfb;"
| 73 || June 19 || Giants || 2–1 || Cahill (7–5) || Affeldt (1–1) || Fuentes (12) || 36,067 || 33–40
|-  style="text-align:center; background:#bfb;"
| 74 || June 21 || @ Mets || 7–3 || Outman (3–1) || Gee (7–1) ||Balfour (2) || 37,019 || 34–40 
|-  style="text-align:center; background:#fbb;"
| 75 || June 22 || @ Mets || 2–3 (13) || Parnell (2–1) || Ziegler (2–1) || || 38,813 || 34–41
|-  style="text-align:center; background:#fbb;"
| 76 || June 23 || @ Mets || 1–4 || Capuano (6–7) || Godfrey (1–1) || Rodríguez (20) || 30,168 || 34–42
|-  style="text-align:center; background:#fbb;"
| 77 || June 24 || @ Phillies || 0–1 || Stutes (3–0) || Fuentes (1–8) || || 45,685 || 34–43
|-  style="text-align:center; background:#bfb;"
| 78 || June 25 || @ Phillies || 4–1 || Cahill (8–5) || Hamels (9–4) || Bailey (5) || 45,785 || 35–43
|-  style="text-align:center; background:#fbb;"
| 79 || June 26 || @ Phillies|| 1–3 || Halladay (10–3) || Outman (3–2) || || 45,863 || 35–44
|-  style="text-align:center; background:#bfb;"
| 80 || June 28 || Marlins  || 1–0 || Gonzalez (7–5) || Vázquez (4–8) || Bailey (6) || 12,124 || 36–44
|-  style="text-align:center; background:#fbb;"
| 81 || June 29 || Marlins  || 0–3 || Nolasco (5–4) || Moscoso (2–4)|| || 17,006 || 36–45
|-  style="text-align:center; background:#fbb;"
| 82 || June 30 || Marlins  || 4–5 || Volstad (4–7) || Cahill (8–6) || Núñez (22) || 18,395 || 36–46
|-

|-  style="text-align:center; background:#bfb;"
| 83 || July 1 || Diamondbacks || 5–4 || Harden (1–0) || Collmenter (4–5) || Bailey (7) || 12,216 || 37–46
|-  style="text-align:center; background:#fbb;"
| 84 || July 2 || Diamondbacks || 2–4 || Saunders (5–7) || Outman (3–9) || Hernandez (3) || 30,338 || 37–47
|-  style="text-align:center; background:#bfb;"
| 85 || July 3 || Diamondbacks || 7–2 || Gonzalez (8–5) || Kennedy (8–3) || || 13,822 || 38–47
|-  style="text-align:center; background:#fbb;"
| 86 || July 4 || Mariners || 1–2 || Pineda (8–5) || McCarthy (1–5) || League (23) || 15,566 || 38–48
|-  style="text-align:center; background:#fbb;"
| 87 || July 5 || Mariners || 2–4 (10) || League (1–4) || Bailey (0–1) || Wright (1) || 11,153 || 38–49
|-  style="text-align:center; background:#bfb;"
| 88 || July 6 || Mariners || 2–0 || Moscoso (3–4) || Vargas (6–6) || Bailey (8) || 19,491 || 39–49
|-  style="text-align:center; background:#fbb;"
| 89 || July 7 || @ Rangers || 0–6 || Holland (7–4) || Harden (1–1) || || 35,041 || 39–50
|-  style="text-align:center; background:#fbb;"
| 90 || July 8 || @ Rangers  || 5–8 || Wilson (9–3) || Gonzalez (8–6) || || 37,858 || 39–51
|-  style="text-align:center; background:#fbb;"
| 91 || July 9 || @ Rangers  || 6–7 || Oliver (2–5) || Bailey (0–2) || || 34,066 || 39–52 
|-  style="text-align:center; background:#fbb;"
| 92 || July 10 || @ Rangers || 0–2 || Harrison (7–7) || Cahill (8–7) || Feliz (18) || 33,834 || 39–53
|- style="text-align:center;"
| colspan="9" style="background:#bfd6d6;"|All-Star Break
|-  style="text-align:center; background:#bfb;"
| 93 || July 15 || Angels || 5–3 || McCarthy (2–5) || Haren (10–6) || Bailey (9) || 18,470 || 40–53
|-  style="text-align:center; background:#fbb;"
| 94 || July 16 || Angels || 2–4 || Weaver (12–4) || Cahill (8–8) || Walden (21) || || 40–54
|-  style="text-align:center; background:#bfb;"
| 95 || July 16 || Angels || 4–3 (10) || Ziegler (3–1) || Thompson (1–3) ||  || 27,379 || 41–54
|-  style="text-align:center; background:#bfb;"
| 96 || July 17 || Angels || 9–1 || Gonzalez (9–6) || Piñeiro (5–4) ||  || 26,115 || 42–54
|-  style="text-align:center; background:#fbb;"
| 97 || July 19 || @ Tigers || 3–8 || Porcello (9–6) || Moscoso (3–5) || || 31,980 || 42–55
|-  style="text-align:center; background:#bfb;"
| 98 || July 20 || @ Tigers || 7–5 || Devine (1–1) || Purcey (1–2) || Bailey (10) || 31,975 || 43–55
|-  style="text-align:center; background:#fbb;"
| 99 || July 22 || @ Yankees || 7–17 || Noesí (2–0) || Cahill (8–9) || || 46,921 || 43–56
|-  style="text-align:center; background:#bfb;"
| 100 || July 23 || @ Yankees || 4–3 || Harden (2–1) || Burnett (8–8) || Bailey (11) || 46,188 || 44–56
|-  style="text-align:center; background:#fbb;"
| 101 || July 24 || @ Yankees || 5–7 || Colón (7–6) || Gonzalez (9–7)|| Rivera (25) || 45,586|| 44–57
|-  style="text-align:center; background:#bfb;"
| 102 || July 25 || Rays || 7–5 || Fuentes (2–8) || Howell (2–2) || Bailey (12) || 11,053 || 45–57
|-  style="text-align:center; background:#bfb;"
| 103 || July 26 || Rays || 6–1 || McCarthy (3–5) || Price (9–9) ||  || 12,166 || 46–57
|-  style="text-align:center; background:#bfb;"
| 104 || July 27 || Rays || 13–4 || Cahill (9–9) || Shields (9–9) ||  || 18,640 || 47–57
|-  style="text-align:center; background:#fbb;"
| 105 || July 28 || Rays || 8–10 || Davis (8–7) || Ziegler (3–2) || Farnsworth (20) || 16,466 || 47–58
|-  style="text-align:center; background:#fbb;"
| 106 || July 29 || Twins || 5–9 || Liriano (7–8) || Gonzalez (9–8) || || 25,656 || 47–59
|-  style="text-align:center; background:#bfb;"
| 107 || July 30 || Twins || 8–3 || Moscoso (4–5) || Blackburn (7–8) || || 19,605 || 48–59
|-  style="text-align:center; background:#bfb;"
| 108 || July 31 || Twins || 7–3 || McCarthy (4–5) || Pavano (6–8) || || 22,452 || 49–59
|-

|-  style="text-align:center; background:#fbb;"
| 109 || August 1 || @ Mariners || 4–8 || Beavan (2–2) || Cahill (9–10) ||  || 23,335 || 49–60
|-  style="text-align:center; background:#fbb;"
| 110 || August 2 || @ Mariners || 2–4 || Hernández (10–9) || Harden (2–2) || League (25) || 22,576 || 49–61
|-  style="text-align:center; background:#fbb;"
| 111 || August 3 ||  @ Mariners || 4–7 || Furbush (2–3) || Gonzalez (9–9) || League (26) || 29,691 || 49–62 
|-  style="text-align:center; background:#fbb;"
| 112 || August 5 || @ Rays || 4–8 || Niemann (6–4) || Moscoso (4–6) ||  || 15,168 || 49–63
|-  style="text-align:center; background:#bfb;"
| 113 || August 6 || @ Rays || 8–0 || McCarthy (5–5) || Cobb (3–2) ||  || 24,939 || 50–63
|-  style="text-align:center; background:#bfb;"
| 114 || August 7 || @ Rays || 5–4 (10) || De Los Santos (1–0) || McGee (0–1) || Bailey (13) || 21,425 || 51–63
|-  style="text-align:center; background:#bfb;"
| 115 || August 9 || @ Blue Jays || 4–1 || Harden (3–2) || Cecil (4–5) || Bailey (14) || 20,521 || 52–63
|-  style="text-align:center; background:#fbb;"
| 116 || August 10 || @ Blue Jays || 4–8 || Janssen (4–0) || Gonzalez (9–10) || Litsch (1) || 19,541 || 52–64
|-  style="text-align:center; background:#bfb;"
| 117 || August 11 || @ Blue Jays || 10–3 || Moscoso (5–6) || Mills (1–2) ||  || 27,918 || 53–64
|-  style="text-align:center; background:#fbb;"
| 118 || August 12 || Rangers || 1–9 || Wilson (11–5) || McCarthy (5–6) ||  || 20,288 || 53–65
|-  style="text-align:center; background:#fbb;"
| 119 || August 13 || Rangers || 1–7 || Lewis (11–8) || Cahill (9–11) ||  || 25,160 || 53–66
|-  style="text-align:center; background:#fbb;"
| 120 || August 14 || Rangers || 6–7 || Adams (1–0) || Bailey (0–3) || Feliz (23) || 15,107 || 53–67
|-  style="text-align:center; background:#fbb;"
| 121 || August 15 || Orioles || 2–6 || Hunter (2–2) || Gonzalez (9–11) ||  || 10,122 || 53–68
|-  style="text-align:center; background:#bfb;"
| 122 || August 16 || Orioles || 8–4 || Moscoso (6–6) || Matusz (1–5) ||  ||12,325  || 54–68
|-  style="text-align:center; background:#bfb;"
| 123 || August 17 || Orioles || 6–5 || McCarthy (6–6) || Simón (3–6) || Bailey (15) || 20,448 || 55–68
|-  style="text-align:center; background:#fbb;"
| 124 || August 18 || Blue Jays || 0–7 || Romero (12–9) || Cahill (9–12) ||  || 12,220 || 55–69
|-  style="text-align:center; background:#bfb;"
| 125 || August 19 || Blue Jays || 2–0 || Harden (4–2) || Cecil (4–6) || Bailey (16) || 13,174 || 56–69
|-  style="text-align:center; background:#bfb;"
| 126 || August 20 || Blue Jays || 5–1 || Gonzalez (10–11) || Álvarez (0–1) ||   || 28,434 || 57–69
|-  style="text-align:center; background:#fbb;"
| 127 || August 21 || Blue Jays || 0–1 || Pérez (3–2) || Moscoso (6–7) || Janssen (2) || 16,811 || 57–70
|-  style="text-align:center; background:#bfb;"
| 128 || August 23 || @ Yankees || 6–5 || McCarthy (7–6) || Colón (8–8) || Bailey (17) || 47,343 || 58–70
|-  style="text-align:center; background:#bfb;"
| 129 || August 24 || @ Yankees || 6–4 (10)|| De Los Santos (2–0) || Soriano (2–2) || Bailey (18) || 47,271 || 59–70
|-  style="text-align:center; background:#fbb;"
| 130 || August 25 || @ Yankees || 9–22 || Logan (4–2) || De Los Santos (2–1) || || 46,369 || 59–71
|-  style="text-align:center; background:#bfb;"
| 131 || August 26 || @ Red Sox || 15–5 || Gonzalez (11–11) || Wakefield (6–6) ||  || 38,239 || 60–71 
|-  style="text-align:center; background:#fbb;"
| 132 || August 27 || @ Red Sox || 3–9 || Lester (14–6) || Moscoso (6–8) ||  || 37,314 || 60–72
|-  style="text-align:center; background:#fbb;"
| 133 || August 27 || @ Red Sox || 0–4 || Aceves (9–1) || Godfrey (1–2) ||  || 37,039 || 60–73
|-  style="text-align:center; background:#fbb;"
| 134 || August 29 || @ Indians || 1–2 || Huff (2–2) || McCarthy (7–7) || C. Perez (30) || 18,201 || 60–74
|-  style="text-align:center; background:#fbb;"
| 135 || August 30 || @ Indians || 2–6 || Gómez (1–2) || Cahill (9–13) || || 20,372 || 60–75
|-  style="text-align:center; background:#fbb;"
| 136 || August 31 || @ Indians || 3–4 (16) || Herrmann (4–0) || Outman (3–4) || || 15,202 || 60–76
|-

|-  style="text-align:center; background:#bfb;"
| 137 || September 1 || @ Indians || 7–0 || Gonzalez (12–11) || Carmona (6–13) || || 14,192 || 61–76
|-  style="text-align:center; background:#bfb;"
| 138 || September 2 || Mariners || 9–2 || Moscoso (7–8) || Vargas (7–13) ||  || 14,972 || 62–76
|-  style="text-align:center; background:#bfb;"
| 139 || September 3 || Mariners || 3–0 || McCarthy (7–8) || Pineda (9–9) ||  || 19,732 || 63–76
|-  style="text-align:center; background:#bfb;"
| 140 || September 4 || Mariners || 8–5 || Cahill (10–13) || Beavan (3–5) || Bailey (19) || 19,384 || 64–76
|-  style="text-align:center; background:#fbb;"
| 141 || September 5|| Royals || 6–11 || Holland (4–1) || Bailey (0–4) || || 14,577 || 64–77
|-  style="text-align:center; background:#fbb;"
| 142 || September 6|| Royals || 4–7 || Duffy (4–8) || Gonzalez (12–12) || Soria (26) || 12,064 || 64–78
|-  style="text-align:center; background:#bfb;"
| 143 || September 7|| Royals || 7–0 || Moscoso (8–8) || Chen (10–7) || || 13,132 || 65–78
|-  style="text-align:center; background:#fbb;"
| 144 || September 9 || @ Rangers || 4–13 || Lewis (12–10) || McCarthy (8–8) || || 36,706 || 65–79
|-  style="text-align:center; background:#bfb;"
| 145 || September 10 || @ Rangers || 8–7 || Cahill (11–13) || Ogando (12–8) || Andrew Bailey (20) || 46,151 || 66–79
|-  style="text-align:center; background:#fbb;"
| 146 || September 11 || @ Rangers || 1–8 || Wilson (16–6) || Outman (3–5) || || 46,727 || 66–80
|-  style="text-align:center; background:#bfb;"
| 147 || September 12 || Angels || 6–3 || Gonzalez (13–12) || Piñeiro (6–7) ||  || 12,858 || 67–80
|-  style="text-align:center; background:#fbb;"
| 148 || September 13 || Angels || 3–6 || Takahashi (4–3) || De Los Santos (2–2) || Walden (30) || 13,212 || 67–81
|-  style="text-align:center; background:#fbb;"
| 149 || September 14 || Angels || 1–4 || Weaver (17–7) || Harden (4–3) || Walden (31)|| 14,743 || 67–82
|-  style="text-align:center; background:#bfb;"
| 150 || September 15 || Tigers || 6–1 || McCarthy (9–8) || Scherzer (14–9) || || 10,925 || 68–82 
|-  style="text-align:center; background:#fbb;"
| 151 || September 16 || Tigers || 1–3 || Fister (9–13) || Cahill (11–14) || Valverde (45) || 31,022 || 68–83
|-  style="text-align:center; background:#bfb;"
| 152 || September 17 || Tigers || 5–3 || Gonzalez (14–12) || Porcello (14–9) || || 19,451 || 69–83
|-  style="text-align:center; background:#fbb;"
| 153 || September 18 || Tigers || 0–3 || Verlander (24–5) || Moscoso (8–9) || Valverde (46) || 18,405 || 69–84
|-  style="text-align:center; background:#fbb;"
| 154 || September 20 || Rangers || 2–7 || Holland (15–5) || Harden (4–4) || || 13,635 || 69–85
|-  style="text-align:center; background:#fbb;"
| 155 || September 21 || Rangers || 2–3 || Uehara (2–3) || Balfour (4–2) || Feliz (29) || 19,589 || 69–86
|-  style="text-align:center; background:#bfb;"
| 156 || September 22 || Rangers || 4–3 || Balfour (5–2) || Adams (4–4) || Bailey (21) || 14,090 || 70–86
|-  style="text-align:center; background:#bfb;"
| 157 || September 23 || @ Angels || 3–1 || Gonzalez (15–12) || Weaver (18–8) || Bailey (22) || 39,217 || 71–86
|-  style="text-align:center; background:#fbb;"
| 158 || September 24 || @ Angels || 2–4 || Williams (4–0) || Moscoso (8–10) || Walden (32) || 41,113 || 71–87
|-  style="text-align:center; background:#bfb;"
| 159 || September 25 || @ Angels || 6–5 || De Los Santos (3–2) || Walden (5–4) || Bailey (23) || 40,794 || 72–87
|-  style="text-align:center; background:#fbb;"
| 160 || September 26 || @ Mariners || 2–4 || Vargas (10–13) || McCarthy (9–9) || League (36) || 17,057 || 72–88
|-  style="text-align:center; background:#bfb;"
| 161 || September 27 || @ Mariners || 7–0 || Cahill (12–14) || Beavan (5–6) ||  || 18,600 || 73–88
|-  style="text-align:center; background:#bfb;"
| 162 || September 28 || @ Mariners || 2–0 ||  Gonzalez (16–12) || Vasquez (1–6) || Bailey (24) ||  20,173 || 74–88
|-

Farm System

Minor League Standings

Tony DeFrancesco moves to AAA-Oklahoma City RedHawks (HOU) after managing in Oakland's farm system for 16 years (except 2008, was on MLB staff).

Top Prospects 

Bold on 40-Man roster to begin 2011 season.
Top Prospects according to Baseball America, Baseball Prospectus
MLB.com named 1B Chris Carter (even though being played as an OF), SS Grant Green and 2B Jemile Weeks as No. 8 top prospects as their positions in MLB.com's 2011 Top 50 Prospects report. FanHouse named Grant Green (58), Chris Carter (91), and Michael Choice (94) to their top 100. Baseball America named Grant Green (63) and Chris Carter (91) to their top 100.

Minor League Info
Joselito Adames, who pitched for AZL Athletics in '10 and STK/VAN in '09, was suspended 50-games for violating MiLB's drug policy in January.

References

2011 Oakland Athletics season at Baseball Reference
2011 Oakland Athletics season Official Site

Oakland Athletics seasons
Oakland Athletics
2010s in Oakland, California
2011 in sports in California